Crateuas may refer to:

 Crateuas or Craterus of Macedon, King of Macedon in 399 BC
 Crateuas, father of Peithon of Macedon
 Crateuas or Cratevas (physician), Greek artist, physician, and herbalist